Modarres Expressway, prior to 1979 Iranian Revolution known as the Shahanshahi Expressway is an expressway in Tehran. It starts from north of Tehran at the end of Chamran Expressway in Elahiyeh and goes south and ends in Haft-e Tir Square. It is named after Hassan Modarres.

Expressways in Tehran